Snelson is a civil parish in the Borough of Cheshire East and ceremonial county of Cheshire in England.  It has a population of 157, rising marginally to 161 at the 2011 Census.

See also

Listed buildings in Snelson, Cheshire

References

Civil parishes in Cheshire